The Waubra Football Netball Club Inc, nicknamed Kangaroos, is an Australian rules football and netball club based in the town of Waubra, Victoria. The team currently plays in the Central Highlands Football League.

History 
Like all small rural towns, every town had persons wanting to participate in the leisure activity of football. Waubra was able to join the nearby Learmonth FA in 1912. They were content to stay in this competition until it dissolved twenty years later. Undaunted the club moved to the replacement competition that was larger in teams and distance in the need to travel. With the dark shadow of war the club moved again this time to the Clunes FA for 1940. This move was because the Burrumbeet DFA had gone into recess.

After World War II, Waubra joined the Ballarat Football League but soon discovered that the standard was too high. Fortunately the Lexton Football League had formed nearby so they transferred in it in 1946. Waubra was the dominant team from the start until 1961. Between 1946 and 1961 the seniors contested 13 out of a possible 16 grand finals, winning 8 of them.

In 1975 Waubra transferred from the Lexton FL to the Clunes Football League. Four years later, the Clunes FL merged with the Ballarat and Bacchus Marsh Football League to form the Central Highlands Football League and Waubra was a founding club.

Leagues and Premierships
Learmonth District Football Association (1912-1933) 
  1922, 1923, 1925 
Burrumbeet and District Football Association (1934-1939) 
 1938, 1939 
Clunes Football Association (1940)
Ballarat Football League (1945)
Lexton Football League (1946–1974)
 1946, 1947, 1948, 1950, 1955, 1956, 1957, 1960
Clunes Football League (1975–1978)
Central Highlands Football League (1979- )
 1982, 2006, 2011, 2019

VFL/AFL players
 Norm Duncan - 
 Alex McDonald - , 
 Anthony McDonald - 
 James McDonald - ,

Bibliography
 History of Football in the Ballarat District by John Stoward -

References

External links
 

Australian rules football clubs in Victoria (Australia)
Netball teams in Victoria (Australia)
Ballarat Football League clubs
1910s establishments in Australia